is a Japanese professional shogi player ranked 8-dan.

Hatakeyama's twin brother Naruyuki is also a professional shogi player. They are the only twins to become professional in history and both became (4-dan) professionals on the same day.

Early life
Hatakeyama was born in Kanagawa Prefecture on June 3, 1969. He earned how to play shogi when he was seven years old after watching his eldest brother playing against his father. Although he and his twin brother Naruyuki learned the game at the same age, he always seem to following in Naruyuki's footsteps.

He entered the Japan Shogi Association's apprentice school in 1984 as apprentice to shogi professional  at the rank of  6-kyū, even though Naruyuki had entered a year earlier and was already ranked 3-kyū. Hatakeyama was promoted to 1-dan in 1986 (the same year as Naruyuki), and to full-professional status and the rank of 4-dan in October 1989 along with Naruyuki after both brothers finished the 5th 3-dan League (April 1989September 1989) with records of 12 wins and 6 losses.

Shogi professional
In 2003, Hatakeyama became the first shogi professional to lose an official NHK Cup NHK Cup TV Shogi Tournament game to a female shogi professional when he was defeated by Hiroe Nakai in Round 1 of the 53rd NHK Cup.

Promotion history
Hatakeyama's promotion history is as follows:
 6-kyū: 1984
 1-dan: 1986
 4-dan: October 1, 1989
 5-dan: December 24, 1993
 6-dan: April 27, 1999
 7-dan: April 1, 2006
 8-dan: September 12, 2019

Awards and honors
In 2014, Hatakeyama received the Japan Shogi Association's "25 Years Service Award" for being an active professional for twenty-five years.

References

External links
ShogiHub: Professional Player Info · Hatakeyama, Mamoru

1969 births
Japanese shogi players
Living people
Professional shogi players
Japanese twins
Professional shogi players from Kanagawa Prefecture